The "Manifesto of Fascist Intellectuals", by the actualist philosopher Giovanni Gentile in 1925, formally established the political and ideologic foundations of Italian Fascism. It justifies the political violence of the Blackshirt paramilitaries of the National Fascist Party (PNF — Partito Nazionale Fascista), in the revolutionary realisation of Italian Fascism as the authoritarian and totalitarian rėgime of Prime Minister Benito Mussolini,  who ruled Italy as Il Duce ("The Leader"), from 1922 to 1943.

Overview
The Manifesto is the ideological précis of the 29 March 1925 Conference of Fascist Culture at Bologna. In support of the government of Benito Mussolini, prominent Italian academic and public intellectuals effected the first formal effort at defining the cultural aspirations of Italian Fascism. As conference Chairman, the Neo-idealist philosopher Gentile publicly proclaimed the alliance between Culture and Fascism, thereby challenging intellectualist critics who questioned the Fascist régime's cultural respectability.

The thesis of the Manifesto of Fascist Intellectuals bases Fascist revolution upon co-operation between Culture and Politics. As a statement of politico-philosophic principles, the Manifesto derived from the "Fascism and Culture" (Fascismo e cultura) lecture Gentile delivered in the "Freedom and Liberalism" (Libertà e liberalismo) session of the cultural conference; although officially attended by more than 400 Italian intellectuals, the document bears only 250 signatures.

The Manifesto was first published in Il Popolo d'Italia (The People of Italy), the PNF newspaper, then by most Italian newspapers on 21 April 1925 — the national, anniversary-day celebration of the Founding of Rome (ca. 21 April 753 BC). The publication date's symbolism was deepened with the contemporary, legal establishment of the celebration of the 21 April Natale di Roma (Birth of Rome), established by Royal decree in early 1925 as a replacement for International Workers' Day.

Many culturally influential Italian public intellectuals signed the Manifesto of the Fascist Intellectuals, among them:

Although not at the Conference of Fascist Culture, the dramaturge and novelist Luigi Pirandello publicly supported the Manifesto of the Fascist Intellectuals with a letter. Meanwhile, the support of Neapolitan poet Di Giacomo provoked Gentile's falling out with Benedetto Croce, his intellectual mentor, who afterwards responded to the Fascist Government's proclamation with his Manifesto of the Anti-Fascist Intellectuals, which was published of the liberal newspaper Il Mondo and the Catholic newspaper Il Popolo.

See also
Manifesto of the Anti-Fascist Intellectuals
Giovanni Gentile

References

Italian fascist works
Political history of Italy
Italian political writers
Modern history of Italy
1925 in politics
1925 documents
1925 in Italy
Giovanni Gentile